Piabuna is a genus of North American araneomorph spiders first described by R. V. Chamberlin & Wilton Ivie in 1933. Originally added to the Liocranidae, it was moved to the Corinnidae in 2002, then to the Phrurolithidae in 2014.

Species
 it contains six species:
Piabuna brevispina Chamberlin & Ivie, 1935 – USA
Piabuna longispina Chamberlin & Ivie, 1935 – USA
Piabuna nanna Chamberlin & Ivie, 1933 (type) – USA
Piabuna pallida Chamberlin & Ivie, 1935 – USA
Piabuna reclusa Gertsch & Davis, 1940 – Mexico
Piabuna xerophila Chamberlin & Ivie, 1935 – USA

References

External links
Piabuna at BugGuide

Araneomorphae genera
Phrurolithidae